Norlie & KKV is a Swedish hip hop rapping and singing duo made up of Sonny Fahlberg (known as Norlie) and Kim Vadenhag (known as KKV). They are signed to Universal Music Sweden.

Career
The duo met in Stockholm suburb of Huddinge in 2008 and formed a duo to release modern rap materials, influenced by pop, rock, house, electro music and techno. They were helped by David Günther, a well-known Stockholm DJ. They released "Can I Be the One", produced by Daniel Gidlund and featuring vocals from Lazee, with the music video filmed in Los Angeles. They also performed at NRJ Summer Club in 2010, in Helsinki's Nickelodeon Dagen 2011 (with Lazee) and in Ungdomens hus i Upplands-Bro (again with Lazee).

In Spring 2011, they were picked as "Artist of the Month" by MTV and Comviq, made a successful appearance at Vakna! med The Voice (meaning Wake up! with The Voice) and were on NRJ radio's landed first on NRJ's "Dagens Topp 3" (meaning "Today's Top 3") with the single "Pressad av tid", landing them a deal with Universal Music.

The duo's debut single for the label was "När jag går ner", which reached number 18 on the Swedish Singles Chart. Their most successful single to date, considering chart positions, is "Mer för varandra", which features estraden. The single peaked at number one on the Swedish Singles Chart.

Discography

Albums

EPs 
 En liten del av någonting (2011)
 Där jag hänger min hatt (2012)

Singles

Videography

Notes

References

External links
Official website
Facebook
YouTube

Hip hop duos
Male musical duos
Musical groups established in 2008
Musical groups from Stockholm
Universal Music Group artists
Swedish musical duos
Swedish-language singers